Stadion MOSiR Bystrzyca is a multi-use stadium in Lublin, Poland. It is currently used mostly for motorcycle speedway matches. The stadium holds 13,000 people.

References

Buildings and structures in Lublin
Sport in Lublin
Sports venues in Lublin Voivodeship
Speedway venues in Poland